The following is a list of ecoregions in Morocco, according to the Worldwide Fund for Nature (WWF). This list does not include the ecoregions of Western Sahara (see List of ecoregions in Western Sahara).

Terrestrial ecoregions

Palearctic

Mediterranean forests, woodlands, and scrub
 Mediterranean dry woodlands and steppe
 Mediterranean woodlands and forests
 Mediterranean acacia-argania dry woodlands and succulent thickets

Temperate coniferous forests
 Mediterranean conifer and mixed forests

Montane grasslands and shrublands
 Mediterranean High Atlas juniper steppe

Deserts and xeric shrublands
 North Saharan steppe and woodlands

Freshwater ecoregions
 Permanent Maghreb
 Temporary Maghreb

Marine ecoregions
 Alboran Sea
 Saharan Upwelling

References
 Burgess, Neil, Jennifer D’Amico Hales, Emma Underwood (2004). Terrestrial Ecoregions of Africa and Madagascar: A Conservation Assessment. Island Press, Washington DC.
 Spalding, Mark D., Helen E. Fox, Gerald R. Allen, Nick Davidson et al. "Marine Ecoregions of the World: A Bioregionalization of Coastal and Shelf Areas". Bioscience Vol. 57 No. 7, July/August 2007, pp. 573-583.
 Thieme, Michelle L. (2005). Freshwater Ecoregions of Africa and Madagascar: A Conservation Assessment. Island Press, Washington DC.

Ecoregions of Morocco
Morocco
Ecoregions